George Edward Mitchell (March 3, 1781 – June 28, 1832) was an American physician and politician who served two terms in the United States House of Representatives from Maryland from 1823 to 1827.

Biography 
Born at present-day Elkton, Maryland, Mitchell completed preparatory studies and graduated from the medical department of the University of Pennsylvania in Philadelphia on June 5, 1805.  He practiced medicine in Elkton from 1806 to 1812.  He was elected to the Maryland House of Delegates in 1808, and served as member of the executive council of Maryland, and as president of the council from 1809 to 1812.  He served in the War of 1812 with the Third Maryland Artillery, and resigned June 1, 1821.

Battle of Fort Oswego in the War of 1812

The American armed forces deduced that a British raiding force was going to attack Fort Oswego. The British raiders would number 500 soldiers, 400 marines, 200 sailors, and 8 warships. The American high command sent George Edward Mitchell to man the fort and try to repel the British. Mitchell arrived at the fort with 242 regulars, 200 militia, and 25 sailors. Mitchell noticed that there was a village full of innocent civilians on the opposite bank. Mitchell did not want the village to be harmed by the British. But he did not have enough men to defend both the fort and the village. So Mitchell used deception by ordering his men to set up many tents near the village on the other bank to give the illusion that there was a great military presence defending the village, so then the British raiders will avoid the village and only attack the fort. After setting countless numbers of tents next to the village.

Mitchell also used another form of deception. To make his numbers look overwhelming, Mitchell marched his army in full view of the British fleet and then marched secretly back to his fort out of view a few times in an attempt to trick the British into believing the Americans were gaining reinforcements.
 
Mitchell concealed his militia in the woods and his other soldiers concealed in the fort. Mitchell placed some of his artillery on the beach. When the British force arrived on May 6, 1814. They avoided the village falling for the phantom army tents ruse to directly attack the fort. The American artillery on the open beach repelled British vessels 3 times before being forced to retreat back to the protection of the fort. The British started landing their troops. The American militia concealed in the woods and the other American troops concealed within the fortification of the fort opened heavy fire on the advancing British. The British troops braved the heavy fire and drove the militia from their hidden positions back to the fort.The Americans behind their sheltered positions in the fort opened heavy fire with cannon and small arms fire. But the British had overwhelming numbers and overran the fort.

Mitchell and his men abandoned the fort and concealed themselves in a ditch in the rear of the fort. When the British advanced, Mitchell and his men charged out of their concealed position and opened a heavy fire on the British. Mitchell and his men then retreated while firing on the enemy. Mitchell destroyed the bridges after passing them in his retreat. The British took every provision and valuable asset they could get their hands on. Then the British withdrew back to their boats and left. The British, still thinking that a large American force was near the village after seeing the empty phantom army tents that Mitchell set up, left the village unharmed. Despite that Mitchell failed to save the fort from destruction, his deceptive use of tricking the British into not harming the village by setting up hundreds of empty army tents near it was successful.The British armed forces lost 17-18 killed and 63-69 wounded.

Congress
Mitchell was elected from the sixth district of Maryland to the Eighteenth and Nineteenth Congresses, and served from March 4, 1823, to March 3, 1827.  He was not a candidate for renomination in 1826, and was an unsuccessful candidate for the governorship in 1829.  He was elected from the sixth district as a Jacksonian to the Twenty-first and Twenty-second Congresses and served from December 7, 1829, until his death in Washington, D.C..  He is interred in the Congressional Cemetery.

See also
List of United States Congress members who died in office (1790–1899)

References

1781 births
1832 deaths
Members of the Maryland House of Delegates
People from Elkton, Maryland
Burials at the Congressional Cemetery
Democratic-Republican Party members of the United States House of Representatives from Maryland
Jacksonian members of the United States House of Representatives from Maryland
Perelman School of Medicine at the University of Pennsylvania alumni
19th-century American politicians